The Real Housewives of D.C. (abbreviated RHODC) is an American reality television series that premiered on Bravo on August 5, 2010. Developed as the fifth installment of The Real Housewives franchise, it aired for one season and documented the personal and professional lives of several women residing in Washington, D.C.

Overview and casting
The Real Housewives of D.C. featured the lives and politics of five women in the Washington, D.C area. The series starred Mary Amons, Lynda Erkiletian, Cat Ommanney, Michaele Salahi and Stacie Scott Turner. 
On April 7, 2011, Bravo canceled The Real Housewives of D.C.. It was the first time in the franchise that one of its United States installments failed to be renewed.

Andy Cohen said the reason for the cancellation was due to "a stink" the Salahis left on the show; and added that he had wanted to bring it back for a second season.

In 2015, the network announced a new installment of The Real Housewives franchise based in the D.C. area titled The Real Housewives of Potomac.

Episodes
Mary Amons, Lynda Erkiletian, Cat Ommanney, Michaele Salahi and Stacie Scott Turner are introduced as series regulars.

References

External links
 
 
 

2010s American reality television series
2010 American television series debuts
2010 American television series endings
English-language television shows
Bravo (American TV network) original programming
Television shows filmed in Washington, D.C.
D. C.
Women in Washington, D.C.